The Wexford County Civic Center is an indoor arena located in Cadillac, Michigan.  It currently seats up to 1,800 in retractable bleachers for sporting events and up to 2,700 for concerts.  An ice arena and the county fairgrounds are nearby.

The Civic Center, which resembles a gymnasium more than an arena, features  of space and can also be used for trade shows, conventions, banquets, circuses and other events.  Currently the locker rooms at the Civic Center are undergoing renovations.

External links
 Wexford County Civic Center

Convention centers in Michigan
Indoor arenas in Michigan
Sports venues in Michigan
Buildings and structures in Wexford County, Michigan